Red Cap Garage, sometimes abridged as Red Cap, was a gay bar and nightclub that operated in Portland, Oregon from 1987 to 2012. The bar was connected to two others called Boxxes and the Brig. It hosted drag queen shows, live music, special events, and viewing parties. In 2012, the bar was sold and closed after operating for 25 years, and the building which housed Red Cap was gutted to make way for the retail alley known as Union Way.

Description and history
Red Cap Garage, established in 1987, occupied a building which once housed a taxicab company. The bar faced Stark Street and was connected to two others called Boxxes and the Brig, and the restaurant Fish Grotto. In 2008, Out Traveler Jason Rowan described the three establishments as: "interconnected bars offer[ing] one-stop shopping: twink go-go boys in Boxxes, dirty smokers in Red Cap, and late-night clubbing at the Brig. Good-natured, sauced-up fun reigns in this trampy labyrinth, especially during Tuesday night drink specials."

Red Cap held events like "Bearracuda", "Peep Show", "Portland Drag Race", "Portland Idol", and "Queerlandia", and hosted disc jockeys as well as the drag queens Joey Arias, Lady Bunny, and Sherry Vine. It also hosted RuPaul's Drag Race participants and viewing parties of the reality competition television series.

In June 2010, the bar's events manager started a project allowing bias crime victims to report incidents to a trained "ally" at Red Cap, following an attack on six gay men who were assaulted after leaving the establishment.

In 2012, rumors began circulating about Red Cap's possible sale and closure. The bar's plans were confirmed on Facebook in a statement which read, in part: 

The nightclub closed on August 18, 2012, after operating for 25 years. The buildings that housed Red Cap and Aura, a nightclub facing Burnside Street, were gutted to create the retail alley Union Way.

Reception

In 2011, Willamette Week Ruth Brown said, "Red Cap Garage still parties like it's 1987. The crowd is generally younger and less hairy than at nearby Scandals, but the huge, heaving sunken dance floor welcomes all comers—from queens to hags—while the entertainment ranges from bingo nights to all-male revues to simply sitting on the heated front patio watching unsuspecting tourists and yuppies wander in off the street—then quickly run out again." In 2012, Red Cap and Aura were co-nominated for the Q Means Business Award at the Q Center's Winter Gala Awards.

In an article confirming the bar's closure, Marjorie Skinner of The Portland Mercury wrote: "While Red Cap was mainly a queer bar, I know I'm not the only ally who will miss it—the people there were always welcoming, the food was totally decent, and the drinks were (sometimes dangerously) cheap (where oh where will I escape to now when Clyde Common is too packed/expensive/stop 'n' chatty??)." PQ Monthly Daniel Borgen called Red Cap a "Stark Street staple for much of our modern gay history". Furthermore, he said of the bar and its closure:

References

External links
 

1987 establishments in Oregon
2012 disestablishments in Oregon
Companies disestablished in 2012
Defunct LGBT nightclubs in Oregon
Defunct nightclubs in Portland, Oregon
Entertainment companies established in 1987
Gay culture in Oregon
LGBT culture in Portland, Oregon
Southwest Portland, Oregon